Alfonso Ugarte (July 13, 1847 – June 7, 1880) was a Peruvian civilian turned military commander during the War of the Pacific, between Peru and Bolivia against Chile. He held the rank of colonel.

Ugarte was born in Tarapacá, Peru, the son of the rich tarapaqueños retailers Don Narciso Ugarte and Doña Rosa Vernal.  At an early age, he was sent by his parents to the Chilean port of Valparaiso, where he was educated, finishing his studies in 1868.  On his return to Peru, he settled in Iquique, where he administered the family business. He was elected City Mayor in 1876.

At the beginning of the War of the Pacific, Ugarte was about to leave the country for a business trip to Europe, but instead he decided to stay in order to organize a battalion using his own money.  This unit was recruited from the workers and craftsmen of Iquique.  It was named "Battalion Iquique N° 1", and it consisted of 429 enlisted men and 36 officers. As he enlisted a whole battalion to the war effort, he was admitted into the army as a colonel.

He fought at the Battle of Tarapacá, where he was injured. The Peruvian forces retreated following this battle, and merged with the Army of the South, commanded by Major General Juan Buendía; the combined force marched from Tarapaca to Arica.

Ugarte was head of the Eighth Division in the defense of the city of Arica, where he participated in the two military councils held by Colonel Francisco Bolognesi, where the agreement was made to defend the bastion "until burning the last round".

Ugarte died fighting at Arica. He rode his horse over the Rock of Arica in order to prevent the Peruvian flag, which he was carrying, from being captured by the Chilean troops. Thus, Alfonso Ugarte indeed fulfilled the promise to fight to the last bullet.

Ugarte is today considered a Peruvian national hero and his sacrifice in Arica together with Colonel Bolognesi and the rest of the garrison is remembered in Peru's Day of the Flag.

1847 births
1880 deaths
Peruvian soldiers
Peruvian people of Spanish descent
Peruvian people of Basque descent
Peruvian military personnel of the War of the Pacific
1880s suicides